Valerie's Home Cooking is an American television cooking show, starring Valerie Bertinelli. It premiered on August 8, 2015 on the Food Network channel.

Episodes

Series overview

Season 1 (2015)

Season 2 (2015–2016)

Season 3 (2016)

Season 4 (2016–2017)

Season 5 (2017)

Season 6 (2017)

Season 7 (2018)

Season 8 (2018)

Season 9 (2019)

Season 10 (2019–2020)

Season 11 (2020)

Season 12 (2021)

Season 13 (2022)

Awards and nominations

|-
| 2018
| Outstanding Culinary Program
| Daytime Emmy Awards
| 
| 
| 
|-
| 2019
| Outstanding Culinary Host
| Daytime Emmy Awards
| 
| 
|
|-
| 2019
| Outstanding Culinary Program
| Daytime Emmy Awards
|  
|
|
|-
| 2020
| Outstanding Culinary Series
| Daytime Emmy Awards
| 
| 
|

References

External links
 

2015 American television series debuts
Daytime Emmy Award for Outstanding Culinary Program winners
Television series by Bunim/Murray Productions
Food Network original programming
Food reality television series